The city of Ottawa, Canada held municipal elections on November 10, 1980.

Mayor Marion Dewar defeated former alderman Pat Nicol in a re-match of the 1978 race. This is the first election in 70 years without the Ottawa Board of Control, as it had been abolished. Council stayed the same size however, as four wards were added.

Mayor

City council

Ottawa Board of Education Trustees
Six to be elected in each zone
 

 

4 to be elected 

1 to be elected

References

Ottawa Citizen, November 11, 1980

Municipal elections in Ottawa
Ottawa municipal election
Ottawa municipal election
1980s in Ottawa
Ottawa municipal election